Bellion may refer to:
 David Bellion (born 27 November 1982 in Paris) is a French footballer of Senegalese origin.
 Dominique Bellion (born 25 August 1948 in Saint-Flour, Cantal) is  a French civil servant (prefect).
 Jon Bellion (born 26 December 1990) is an American singer, songwriter, producer and rapper.
 Roger Bellion(1914-1986), French civil servant (prefect) and French writer using the pseudonym Roger Rabiniaux